Arthur William John Lewis (21 February 1917 – 25 June 1998)  was a British Labour Party politician.

Biography
Lewis was educated at Borough Polytechnic and began work as a fitter with the City of London Corporation. He was an official of the National Union of General and Municipal Workers 1938–48. He signed the first trade union agreement with the catering industry and gained 20,000 new trade union members in the West End, London.

Lewis was Member of Parliament (MP) for Upton from 1945 to 1950, for West Ham North from 1950 to 1974, and then for Newham North West from 1974 to 1983.

In 1981, after 36 years as an MP, Lewis was deselected as Labour candidate by his local constituency Labour Party, which he said had become "100 per cent Trotskyist, Militant Tendency, Communist and IRA supporters". By this time he was refusing to attend local party meetings or hold "advice surgeries" for his constituents.

He was replaced as Labour candidate by the future minister Tony Banks. Lewis stood as an Independent Labour candidate at the 1983 election, coming fourth with 11% of the vote behind the winner, Banks.

Notes

References
Times Guide to the House of Commons, 1950, 1966 and 1983

External links 
 

Lewis, Arthur William
Lewis, Arthur William
Lewis, Arthur William
Lewis, Arthur William
Members of the Fabian Society
Lewis, Arthur William
Lewis, Arthur William
Lewis, Arthur William
Lewis, Arthur William
Lewis, Arthur William
Lewis, Arthur William
Lewis, Arthur William
Lewis, Arthur William
Lewis, Arthur William
Lewis, Arthur William
Lewis, Arthur William
Lewis, Arthur William
20th-century British businesspeople